The Screen Writers Guild was an organization of Hollywood screenplay authors, formed as a union in 1933. In 1954, it became two different organizations: Writers Guild of America, West and the Writers Guild of America, East.

Founding 
Screenwriters' earliest attempts at organizing date back to the 1910s, when film scenarists participated in The Authors League of America (now the Authors Guild). However, screenwriters soon identified a need to form their own organization, since they had different work products and challenges than literary writers. Another attempt at representation was the Photoplay Authors’ League, founded in 1914 in Los Angeles, but it disbanded after two years.

In Summer 1920, twelve writers announced the formation of the Screen Writers Guild. They published an open letter in Variety, defining six objectives of the organization, and inviting all industry writers to apply for membership. Members had to derive income from some form of film writing, and to receive nominations from two existing members.

The Guild also formed a social arm, The Writers. The club purchased a mansion on Sunset Boulevard and converted it to a clubhouse, which became a gathering place for SWG members. The Writers held numerous dinners, parties, and presentations of one-act plays through the mid-1930s.

Starting in 1927, several historic trends caused the SWG's organizing and representation efforts to become nearly inactive. Louis B. Mayer founded the Academy of Motion Pictures Arts and Sciences as a means of bypassing union negotiations. Warner Brothers released the first commercial sound film, The Jazz Singer, bringing fundamental changes to screenwriting. And the Great Depression began taking a toll on all aspects of filmmaking economics.

In 1933, ten writers met to discuss revitalizing the SWG as union under the protection of laws governing unions under consideration by Congress and eventually embodied in the Wagner Act of 1935. They included Donald Ogden Stewart, Charles Brackett, John Bright, Philip Dunne, Dorothy Parker and Howard J. Green; the union's first president. Others active in the 1930s included Lillian Hellman, Dashiell Hammett, Ogden Nash, Frances Goodrich, Albert Hackett, and Maurice Rapf. It sought to establish criteria for crediting authors for creating or contributing to a screenplay, known as "screen credits." The film studios responded by refusing to hire Guild members and forming a rival organization called the Screen Playwrights. When the Guild appealed to the National Labor Relations Board (NLRB), the NLRB certified the Guild as the "exclusive bargaining agency" for screenwriters employed by 13 of 18 Hollywood studios, based on elections in which writers chose the Guild over the Screen Playwrights. The film producers acceded to the NLRB ruling in March 1939.

Beginning in 1940, the Guild came under attack by the House Committee on Un-American Activities for the radical communist leanings of many of its members. The attacks escalated in 1947, when more than a dozen writers were called to testify. Hellman responded with an essay in the Screen Writer, the Guild's publication, attacking the Committee for its investigation and the film industry's owners for submitting to the Committee's intimidation. It described the Committee's hearings:

In 1954, the members of the Screen Writers Guild backed the formation of a national union of a broader organization of writers working in motion pictures, television and radio, divided into two geographical bodies: Writers Guild of America, West and the Writers Guild of America, East.

See also 
Writers Guild of America

References

Additional sources
Larry Ceplair and Steven Englund, The Inquisition in Hollywood: Politics in the Film Community, 1930-1960 (University of California Press, 1983)
David L. Goodrich, The Real Nick and Nora: Frances Goodrich and Albert Hackett, Writers of Stage and Screen Classics (Southern Illinois University Press 2004)
Victor S. Navasky, Naming Names (Macmillan, 2003)
Nancy Lynn Schwartz, The Hollywood Writers' War (NY: Knopf, 1982)
Colin Shindler, Hollywood in Crisis: Cinema and American Society, 1929-1939 (Psychology Press, 1996)

Scriptwriters' trade unions

Trade unions established in 1933
Trade unions in the United States
American writers' organizations